Roger Faligot is a French journalist, who started working in Ireland in 1973 before working as freelance investigative journalist for British, Parisian or foreign newspapers and magazines (Ireland, England, Japan). Considered one of the best French specialists of Ireland, he was special correspondent of the weekly The European, based in London, for seven years in the 1990s. Roger Faligot presided the Association des journalistes bretons et des pays celtiques from 1993 to 2000.

Starting in 1977, he wrote, alone or with co-authors, more than 30 books concerning contemporary history, spycraft, etc. He speaks many languages, among which Chinese. He noted in Guerre spéciale en Europe (1980) that Frank Kitson's 1971 book, Low Intensity Operations: Subversion, Insurgency and Peacekeeping, considered the "Bible" used by the British Army during the Troubles in Ireland quoted most of all Roger Trinquier, French theorist of counter-insurgency.

Bibliography
 La résistance irlandaise, 1916-1976, Paris : Maspéro, 1977
 Guerre spéciale en Europe, Paris : Flammarion, 1980
 Nous avons tué Mountbatten ! L'IRA parle, témoignages recueillis par Roger Faligot, Paris : Picollec, 1981
 Bloc H ou la Ballade de Colm Brady, Lyon : Jacques-Marie Laffont, 1981
 Constance Markievicz, in : Des femmes dans le monde (collectif), Paris : Messidor-Temps Actuels, 1982
 Les services spéciaux de sa majesté, Paris : Messidor, Temps actuels, 1982
 Au cœur de l'État, l'espionnage. Autrement, 1983, avec Rémi Kauffer.
 Markus, espion allemand. Messidor, 1984. livre consacré à Richard Christmann, espion allemand ayant porté l'uniforme du 1er REC de 1926 à 1931
 Service B. Le reseau d'espionnage le plus secret de la Seconde guerre mondiale. Fayard, 1985
 La Piscine. Les Services Secrets Français, 1944-1984. Seuil, 1985. avec Pascal Krop.
 Les résistants : de la guerre de l'ombre aux allées du pouvoir 1944-1989. Fayard, 1989. avec Rémi Kauffer.
 As tu vu Jean Cremet ?. Fayard. 1991. avec Rémi Kauffer
 Eminences grises Fayard. 1992. avec Rémi Kauffer
  La résistance irlandaise, 1916-1992, Rennes : Terre de Brume, 1992
 Histoire mondiale du renseignement. Laffont, 1993, avec Rémi Kauffer.
 La harpe et l'hermine, Rennes : Terre de brume, 1994
 Le marché du Diable.  Fayard, 1995, avec Rémi Kauffer. Analyse très documentée des milieux de l’irrationnel (magie, voyance, astrologie), des sectes et de ceux qui les combattent ("eux-mêmes souvent trop sectaires pour être efficaces"), des ordres templiers et para-politiques, des sectes orientales, et des moyens médiatiques de ce marché juteux, en passant sur les origines curieuses de certaines histoires de soucoupes volantes, nées dans le cerveau d'agents du KGB.
 L’Empire invisible ; les mafias chinoises, Philippe Picquier, 1996
 Naisho. Enquête au cœur des services secrets japonais. La Découverte, 1997.
 BZH, des Bretons, des Bretagnes, documentaire retraçant l’histoire du Mouvement breton, d’hier à aujourd’hui, de Olivier Bourbeillon, Marie Hélia et Roger Faligot. 1997.
 Porno business. Fayard, 1998, avec Rémi Kauffer.
  James Connolly et le mouvement révolutionnaire irlandais, Rennes : Terre de Brume, 1999
 DST police secrète, Flammarion, 1999. avec Pascal Krop.
 La résistance irlandaise, 1916-2000, Rennes : Terre de Brume, 1999
 Le Croissant et la croix gammée : Les Secrets de l'alliance entre l'Islam et le nazisme d'Hitler à nos jours. Albin Michel. 2000, avec Rémi Kauffer.
 La Mafia Chinoise En Europe. Calmann-Lévy, 2001
 Le peuple des enfants, Paris : Seuil, 2004
 L'Hermine rouge de Shanghai. Les Portes du Large, 2004, avec Rémi Kauffer.
 Les seigneurs de la paix, Editions du Seuil, 2006
 Histoire secrète de la Ve République, Editions La Découverte 2006,  avec Jean Guisnel il dirige une équipe de 7 journalistes d'investigation en nous ouvrant les sombres coulisses de la Ve République.
 Les mystères d'Irlande, (Irish Mysteries) Yoran Embanner publishers, 2007,
A paperback selection of thirty years of reporting on Irish affairs.
 Les services secrets chinois, de Mao aux JO (The Chinese Secret Service, from Mao to the Olympic Games), Nouveau Monde publishers, Paris, 2008.
A 600-page investigative report on Chinese intelligence and their activities from the 1920s up to this day, especially the Guoanbu.

Year of birth missing (living people)
Living people
French investigative journalists
French male non-fiction writers